Rasulov is an Azeri and Central Asian surname. It's female form is Rasulova.It is a slavicised version of Rasul with addition of the suffix -ov. Notable people with the surname include:

 Abdukhamidullo Rasulov (1961), Uzbek football assistant referee
 Elcan Rasulov (1987), Azerbaijani actor, TV presenter, showman
 Elhan Rasulov (1960), former Soviet and Azerbaijani footballer
 Elshod Rasulov (1986), Uzbek boxer
 Jabbor Rasulov (1913–1982), Soviet diplomat
 Lidiya Khudat Rasulova (1941–2012), Azerbaijani politician
 Luiza Rasulova (born 1995), Uzbek actress and presenter
 Majid Rasulov (1916–1993),  Azerbaijani scientist and academician
 Muharram Rasulova (1926–2006), Tajikistani botanist
 Oksana Rasulova (born 1982), Azerbaijani dancer, choreographer and actress
 Vugar Rasulov (1991), Azerbaijani chess Grandmaster

Uzbek-language surnames
Azerbaijani-language surnames
Tajik-language surnames
Russian-language surnames
Kazakh-language surnames